Jason Charles Bates (born January 5, 1971) is an American former Major League Baseball infielder who played a total of four seasons, spanning from 1995 to 1998. Bates played his final game on September 27, 1998, as a member of the Colorado Rockies.

External links

1971 births
Living people
Sportspeople from Downey, California
Arizona Wildcats baseball players
Cypress Chargers baseball players
Baseball players from California
Colorado Rockies players
Major League Baseball second basemen